Daouda Nabi (born 31 December 1989) is a Burkinabé football midfielder who plays for ASFA Yennenga.

References

1989 births
Living people
Burkinabé footballers
Burkina Faso international footballers
Burkinabé Premier League players
RC Bobo Dioulasso players
ASFA Yennenga players
Association football midfielders
People from Centre-Ouest Region
21st-century Burkinabé people